We're in the Legion Now is a 1936 American adventure comedy film directed by Crane Wilbur and shot in Magnacolor. The film is also known as The Rest Cure (American reissue title), which was the title of the 1934 original J.D. Newsom story the film was based on.

Plot
Two petty criminals are pursued by a gangster from the United States to Paris, France, where they enlist into the French Foreign Legion to escape. After being drafted to a garrison in North Africa, they fall foul of military authority and are sent to a sadistic punishment camp, where they lead an insurrection against its commanding officer, and then help to defeat a native Mohammedan revolt.

Cast
Reginald Denny as Dan Linton
Esther Ralston as Louise Rillette
Vince Barnett as Spike Conover
Eleanor Hunt as Honey Evans
Claudia Dell as Yvonne Cartier
Robert Frazer as Capt. Henri Rillette
Rudolph Anders as Sgt. Groeber
Francisco Marán as Abdul Ben-Abou
Merrill McCormick as Ali
Frank Hoyt as Adjutant Cartellini
Manuel Peluffo as Military Prisoner
Charles Moyer as Recruit Ringleader
Lou Hicks as Al Petrelli, American Gangster

References

External links

1936 films
1930s color films
1930s adventure comedy films
Films about the French Foreign Legion
Grand National Films films
Cinecolor films
American adventure comedy films
Films set in Africa
Films set in deserts
American multilingual films
Films based on short fiction
Films directed by Crane Wilbur
1936 multilingual films
1936 comedy films
1930s English-language films
1930s American films